Ahrntal is a comune (municipality) in South Tyrol in northern Italy, located about  northeast of the city of Bolzano (Bozen), on the border with Austria.

Geography
Ahrntal borders the following municipalities: Mühlwald, Prettau, Sand in Taufers, Brandberg (Austria), Finkenberg (Austria), and Mayrhofen (Austria).

Frazioni
The municipality of Ahrntal contains the frazioni (subdivisions, mainly villages and hamlets) Luttach (Lutago), Steinhaus (Cadipietra), St. Jakob (San Giacomo), St. Johann (San Giovanni), St. Peter (San Pietro) and Weißenbach (Riobianco).

Weißenbach is composed of picturesque alpine farmhouses, grouped around the foaming white glacial stream from which its name is derived.

Topography 
To the north, west and southwest the municipality is surrounded by the Zillertal Alps. The main chain of these Alps at the head of the valley also forms the border with Austria. Amongst the most important mountains in the municipality are the Turnerkamp (3,418 m), the Hornspitzen, the Schwarzenstein (3,369 m), the Großer Löffler (3,379 m), the Wollbachspitze (3,210 m) and the Napfspitze (3,144 m). The ranges to the west and southwest, including the Speikboden massiv, separate the village of Ahrntal from Mühlwald in the Mühlwalder Tal. To the southeast are the Durreck Group, a subrange of the Venediger Group with the Durreck (3,135 m) and the Hirbernock (3,010 m) which form the boundary of the municipality of Reintal and its village of Rein in Taufers. Large parts of the Durreck Group are protected as part of the Rieserferner-Ahrn Nature Park.

History
The pride of the village is the Church of St. Jacob, dating from the 16th century. The church houses a valuable winged altar from 1516, which was restored in 1884. Also of note are both the modern extension to the church building and the newly arranged adjoining cemetery.

Place name
A name for the valley was first recorded in written sources in the 11th century. An Aurina vallis is mentioned in 1048, between 1070 and 1080 Ourin or Ouren appear in documents.

Coat-of-arms
The emblem is tierced of paly: in the first and third are four and half points of argent on azure, in the second a vert pale with a wavy line of argent. The emblem show the position of the municipality along the green valley with the river Ahr and the mountains all around. The emblem was granted in 1969.

Notable people 
 Simon Maurberger (born 1995) World Cup alpine ski racer.

Society

Linguistic distribution
According to the 2011 census, 98.76% of the population speak German, 0.93% Italian and 0.31% Ladin as first language.

Demographic evolution

See also 
Tauferer Ahrntal

Further reading 
 Das Ahrntal: heimatkundliche Beiträge. Der Schlern 52/1978, H. 7/8.
 Ahrntal: ein Gemeindebuch. Gemeinde Ahrntal, Steinhaus 1999 (with contributions by Christoph von Hartungen, Ernst Hofer, Reimo Lunz, Lydia Reichegger, Walburg Tanzer, Hannes Obermair, Gertrud Egger, Brigitte Niederkofler, Mathias Schmelzer, Sieglinde Hofer, Margareth Kamelger, and Martha Verdorfer).
 Rudolf Tasser, Das Obermair Medizinbuch aus St. Jakob im Ahrntal. In Wolfgang Ingenhaeff (ed.), Bergvolk und Medizin. Berenkamp, Innsbruck 2005, pp. 321–370.
 Tauferer Ahrntal. Geschichte und Zukunft. Tappeiner, Lana 2007, .
 Paul Gruber, Franz Josef Künig (eds), Peter Wasserer 1822 bis 1845, Provinz Verlag, Brixen 2010

References

External links

  

Municipalities of South Tyrol
Rieserferner-Ahrn Nature Park
Articles which contain graphical timelines